Xipu Road (Chinese: 西浦路) is a metro station on Line 6 of the Hangzhou Metro in China. Opened on 30 December 2020, it is located on the east bank of Qiantang River, in the Binjiang District of Hangzhou.

References 

Hangzhou Metro stations
Railway stations in China opened in 2020
Railway stations in Zhejiang